Shaun Jolly (born October 17, 1998) is an American football cornerback for the Los Angeles Rams of the National Football League (NFL).

Personal life and high school
Shaun Jolly was born on October 17, 1998, in Stone Mountain, Georgia. Jolly attended Stephenson High School and had a successful high school tenure, being named to the Georgia all-star team.

College career
Jolly was rated as a two-star cornerback by Scout.com and chose to attend Appalachian State University. Jolly redshirted his freshman year and never played a down that season. In his next year, Jolly played in eleven games in defensive and special teams roles, including playing in the New Orleans Bowl against Middle Tennessee. Jolly was highly rated in his sophomore year, being named a second-team All-American and first-team all Sun Belt for having five interceptions on the year and two interceptions returned for touchdowns. In Jolly's junior year he was named an honorable All-American and started all twelve games with 41 tackles and six pass breakups. In Jolly's senior and final year, he started all nine of the games he appeared in and was first-team All-Sun Belt.

Professional career

Cleveland Browns
After going undrafted in the 2022 NFL Draft, Jolly was signed as an undrafted free agent by the Cleveland Browns. Jolly did not make the active roster but was signed to the practice squad.

Los Angeles Rams
Jolly was signed from the practice squad of the Browns to the active roster of the Los Angeles Rams.

On March 15, 2023, Jolly was tendered by the Los Angeles Rams.

References

Living people
1998 births
Los Angeles Rams players
Cleveland Browns players
People from Stone Mountain, Georgia
Sportspeople from DeKalb County, Georgia
Players of American football from Georgia (U.S. state)
Appalachian State Mountaineers football players